Vituliconus is a synonym of Conus (Strategoconus) da Motta, 1991: synonym of  Conus Linnaeus, 1758
proposed genus of sea snails, marine gastropod mollusks in the family Conidae, the cone snails and their allies.

Species
 Vituliconus augur (Lightfoot, 1786): synonym of  Conus augur Lightfoot, 1786 
 Vituliconus circumactus (Iredale, 1929): synonym of  Conus circumactus Iredale, 1929 
 Vituliconus ferrugineus (Hwass in Bruguière, 1792): synonym of  Conus ferrugineus Hwass in Bruguière, 1792 
 Vituliconus planorbis (Born, 1778): synonym of  Conus planorbis Born, 1778 
 Vituliconus striatellus (Link, 1807): synonym of  Conus striatellus Link, 1807 
 Vituliconus swainsoni (Estival & Cosel, 1986): synonym of  Conus swainsoni Estival & Cosel, 1986

References

External links
 To World Register of Marine Species

Conidae